The Puritan Backroom is a 2020 James Beard Foundation Award America's Classic restaurant in Manchester, New Hampshire. They are known for their mudslides and chicken tenders, which they claim to have invented.

History
Arthur Pappas and Louis Canotas, Greek emigrants to the United States, opened the Puritan Confectionery Company in 1917. In 1974, their children attached a back room for a restaurant. As of 2020, the restaurant is run by the third generation, including New Hampshire congressman Chris Pappas. The restaurant "has become a required stop for candidates passing through on the campaign trail. In an era of division, it is a rare nonpartisan space where everyone feels welcome.",  In recent election cycles, George H. W. Bush and Bill Clinton visited the restaurant.

Setbacks
On November 24, 2019, norovirus struck 18 people who attended a private function at the restaurant, and may have caused the death of one person. In March 2020, a fire caused about $80,000 in damage. In September 2020, they closed for a short time after a bartender tested positive for COVID-19.

References

External links

Familiar Stumps: The Puritan Backroom

James Beard Foundation Award winners
Restaurants in New Hampshire
Buildings and structures in Manchester, New Hampshire